is a Japanese construction company founded in Fukui, Fukui Prefecture, Japan. The company still has registered headquarters in Fukui, but the actual head office is located in Shinjuku, Tokyo.

History
Santaro Kumagai, the company's founder, began his career as a civil servant in a police department. His construction career started as a stonemason, crafting religious monuments and performing work for the expanding railway network.

Kumagai founded his own company in 1898 and incorporated it in 1938. Between 1955 and 1983 the company accounted for more than 10% of all contracts awarded to the fifty-seven members of the Overseas Construction Association of Japan, a figure that outranked the ‘Big Five’ domestic giant construction companies. As overseas projects were riskier, these five companies were reluctant to expand beyond Japan. Kumagai Gumi took advantage of the situation and sought work overseas, as both as a construction company and a developer, using BOT as project financing, becoming one of the leading proponents of BOT in Southeast Asia. By 1985 overseas earnings amounted to 46% of Kumagai's total contracts.

In the 1980s the company became the largest Japanese real estate investor in New York City, investing in projects in Manhattan, including in projects developed by William Zeckendorf Jr.

Major works

Dams and railways
Tokuyama Dam - Ibigawa
Mass Transit Railway - Hong Kong (numerous contracts)
Delhi Metro Yellow line - Delhi
Taipei Metro Bannan Line - Taipei
Bangkok Metropolitan Rapid Transit Blue Line - Bangkok
Marmaray rail link - Istanbul

Tunnels
 Water tunnel at Plover Cove - New Territories, Hong Kong
 Modified Initial System (section between Admiralty and Tsim Sha Tsui stations) - Victoria City and Kowloon, Hong Kong 
Seikan Tunnel - Aomori and Hakodate
Eastern Harbour Crossing - Hong Kong
Sydney Harbour Tunnel - Sydney
Western Harbour Crossing - Hong Kong
Eagle's Nest Tunnel - Hong Kong

Skyscrapers
Taipei 101 - Taipei
Bank of China Tower - Hong Kong
Shun Hing Square - Shenzhen
CITIC Plaza - Guangzhou
Dayabumi Complex - Kuala Lumpur
Bank of China Tower - Shanghai
Melbourne Central - Melbourne

Hotels
Çırağan Palace - Istanbul

References

External links

 Kumagai Gumi
 Kumagai Gumi

Construction and civil engineering companies of Japan
Construction and civil engineering companies based in Tokyo
Companies based in Fukui Prefecture
Construction and civil engineering companies established in 1898
Companies listed on the Tokyo Stock Exchange
Japanese brands
Japanese companies established in 1898